Kévin Cabral (born 10 July 1999) is a French professional footballer who plays as a winger for Major League Soccer club Colorado Rapids.

Career

Valenciennes 
Cabral was a youth product of Paris Saint-Germain before moving to Valenciennes in 2017. He made his professional debut in a 1–0 Ligue 2 loss to Orléans on 19 October 2018.

LA Galaxy 
On 8 April 2021, Cabral signed a five-year deal with Major League Soccer club LA Galaxy.

Colorado Rapids
On 8 December 2022, Cabral was traded by LA Galaxy to Colorado Rapids in exchange for up to $1 million in General Allocation Money.

Personal life
Born in France, Cabral is of Cape Verdean descent. His twin brother, Rémi, is also a footballer and plays for LA Galaxy II in the USL Championship.

References

External links

 
 

1999 births
Living people
Footballers from Paris
Association football forwards
French footballers
French sportspeople of Cape Verdean descent
Paris Saint-Germain F.C. players
Valenciennes FC players
Ligue 2 players
LA Galaxy players
Colorado Rapids players
Designated Players (MLS)
Expatriate soccer players in the United States
French expatriate footballers
French expatriate sportspeople in the United States
Twin sportspeople
Major League Soccer players

French people of Cape Verdean descent